Megachile octosignata is a species of bee in the family Megachilidae. It was described by Nylander in 1852.  Native to Europe, the bees nest in rock crevices and make their cells out of leaf scraps.

References

Octosignata
Insects described in 1852
Taxa named by William Nylander (botanist)